35 & Ticking (also known as Russ Parr's 35 & Ticking or 35 and Ticking) is an American romantic comedy film written and directed by Russ Parr.

The film stars a mostly African American ensemble cast featuring Meagan Good, Nicole Ari Parker, Tamala Jones, Kevin Hart, Kym Whitley, Darius McCrary, Dondre Whitfield, Mike Epps, Luenell, Clifton Powell, Jill Marie Jones, Wendy Raquel Robinson, and Keith Robinson. The film had its limited release in theaters on May 20, 2011.

Premise
35 & Ticking centers around the lives of Victoria, Zenobia, Cleavon, and Phil—all friends over the age of 35 and struggling to build the families they've always dreamed of. While Zenobia (Nicole Ari Parker) is still looking for a man, Victoria (Tamala Jones) is married to a man who doesn't want children. Cleavon (Kevin Hart), meanwhile, is too geeky to get a woman, and Phil (Keith Robinson) is already married with children, but his wife is not very interested in being a mother. All four of them try to rectify their romantic lives and futures while their biological clocks tick away.

Cast
 Nicole Ari Parker as Zenobia
 Reign Edwards as young Zenobia
 Keith Robinson as Phil
 Tamala Jones as Victoria
 Kevin Hart as Cleavon
 Meagan Good as Falinda
 Jill Marie Jones as Coco
 Kym Whitley as Shavelle
 Luenell as Donya
 Darius McCrary as Nick West
 Dondre Whitfield as Austin
 Mike Epps as Harold
 Wendy Raquel Robinson as Calise
 Clifton Powell as Zane
 Aaron D. Spears as Officer Jones
 Angelique Bates as Gangsta Girl
 Skoti Collins as Officer Bade

See also
List of black films of the 2010s

References

External links
 
 
 
 

2011 films
African-American comedy films
American romantic comedy films
2010s English-language films
Films directed by Russ Parr
2010s American films